In vector calculus, a topic in pure and applied mathematics, a poloidal–toroidal decomposition is a restricted form of the Helmholtz decomposition. It is often used in the spherical coordinates analysis of solenoidal vector fields, for example, magnetic fields and incompressible fluids.

Definition

For a three-dimensional vector field F with zero divergence

this F can be expressed as the sum of a toroidal field T and poloidal vector field P

where r is a radial vector in spherical coordinates (r, θ, φ). The toroidal field is obtained from a scalar field, Ψ(r, θ, φ), as the following curl,

and the poloidal field is derived from another scalar field Φ(r, θ, φ), as a twice-iterated curl,

This decomposition is symmetric in that the curl of a toroidal field is poloidal, and the curl of a poloidal field is toroidal, known as Chandrasekhar–Kendall function.

Geometry

A toroidal vector field is tangential to spheres around the origin,

while the curl of a poloidal field is tangential to those spheres

The poloidal–toroidal decomposition is unique if it is required that the average of the scalar fields Ψ and Φ vanishes on every sphere of radius r.

Cartesian decomposition 

A poloidal–toroidal decomposition also exists in Cartesian coordinates, but a mean-field flow has to be included in this case. For example, every solenoidal vector field can be written as

 

where  denote the unit vectors in the coordinate directions.

See also

 Toroidal and poloidal
 Chandrasekhar–Kendall function

Notes

References 
 Hydrodynamic and hydromagnetic stability, Chandrasekhar, Subrahmanyan; International Series of Monographs on Physics, Oxford: Clarendon, 1961, p. 622.
 Decomposition of solenoidal fields into poloidal fields, toroidal fields and the mean flow. Applications to the boussinesq-equations, Schmitt, B. J. and von Wahl, W; in The Navier–Stokes Equations II — Theory and Numerical Methods, pp. 291–305; Lecture Notes in Mathematics, Springer Berlin/ Heidelberg, Vol. 1530/ 1992.
 Anelastic Magnetohydrodynamic Equations for Modeling Solar and Stellar Convection Zones, Lantz, S. R. and Fan, Y.; The Astrophysical Journal Supplement Series, Volume 121, Issue 1, Mar. 1999, pp. 247–264.
 Plane poloidal-toroidal decomposition of doubly periodic vector fields: Part 1. Fields with divergence and Part 2. Stokes equations. G. D. McBain. ANZIAM  J. 47 (2005)
 .
 .
 .

Vector calculus